Néstor Villarreal Castro (born 24 August 1953) is a Mexican politician from the National Action. From 2000 to 2003 he served as Deputy of the LVIII Legislature of the Mexican Congress representing Coahuila.

References

1953 births
Living people
Politicians from Torreón
National Action Party (Mexico) politicians
21st-century Mexican politicians
Deputies of the LVIII Legislature of Mexico
Members of the Chamber of Deputies (Mexico) for Coahuila